Sean de Silva (born 17 January 1990) is a Trinidadian professional footballer.

Club career
Born in Port-of-Spain, De Silva played youth football in his native Trinidad and Tobago for St. Ann's Rangers, before attending the College of Charleston in the United States.

On 2 May 2013, according to a tweet, De Silva signed with NASL club Minnesota United FC.

However following the end of his university education De silva returned to his native country to play for Central Fc.

International career
De Silva played youth international football for Trinidad and Tobago, participating in the 2007 FIFA U-17 World Cup and 2009 FIFA U-20 World Cup. De Silva made his full international debut in March 2009.

References

External links
 
 

Living people
1989 births
Sportspeople from Port of Spain
Association football midfielders
Trinidad and Tobago footballers
Trinidad and Tobago international footballers
College of Charleston Cougars men's soccer players
Minnesota United FC (2010–2016) players
Central F.C. players
Haukar men's football players
Njarðvík FC players
1. deild karla players
North American Soccer League players
TT Pro League players
Trinidad and Tobago expatriate footballers
Trinidad and Tobago expatriate sportspeople in the United States
Expatriate soccer players in the United States
Trinidad and Tobago under-20 international footballers
Trinidad and Tobago youth international footballers